The Junior ABA League MVP award, also known as the Adriatic League U-19 MVP award, is an annual award that is given to the most valuable player of the European regional Adriatic Junior ABA League, which is the young top-tier level professional basketball league for countries of the former Yugoslavia. The award has been given since the 2017–18 Junior ABA League season.

Winners

See also
Junior ABA League Ideal Starting Five

References

External links
 Adriatic ABA League official website
 Adriatic ABA League page at Eurobasket.com

U19 ABA League Championship
Basketball most valuable player awards